The Mexicali Kid is a 1938 American Western film directed by Wallace Fox and written by Robert Emmett Tansey. The film stars Jack Randall, Wesley Barry, Eleanor Stewart, Wilhelm von Brincken, Chester Gan and Glenn Strange. The film was released on September 14, 1938, by Monogram Pictures.

Plot
Jack is after his brother's killer, he finds The Mexicali Kid collapsed in the desert and saves him, they team up and The Mexicali Kid leads him to Gorson and his men.

Cast          
Jack Randall as Jack Wood
Wesley Barry as The Mexicali Kid
Eleanor Stewart as Jean Carter
Wilhelm von Brincken as Frederick Gorson 
Chester Gan as McCarty
Glenn Strange as Jed 
Billy Bletcher as Stagecoach Driver
Ernie Adams as Carl 
Ed Cassidy as Sheriff Ed
Bud Osborne as Chris Collins
George Chesebro as Joe Collins

References

External links
 

1938 films
American Western (genre) films
1938 Western (genre) films
Monogram Pictures films
Films directed by Wallace Fox
American black-and-white films
1930s English-language films
1930s American films